Epiblastus is a genus of orchids with 22 known species distributed from New Guinea, Philippines, Maluku, Sulawesi, Fiji, the Solomons, the Bismarcks, Samoa and Vanuatu.

List of species 
Epiblastus accretus J.J.Sm., Bot. Jahrb. Syst. 66: 176 (1934).
Epiblastus acuminatus Schltr., Repert. Spec. Nov. Regni Veg. Beih. 1: 239 (1911).
Epiblastus angustifolius Schltr., Repert. Spec. Nov. Regni Veg. 16: 215 (1919).
Epiblastus auriculatus Schltr., Repert. Spec. Nov. Regni Veg. Beih. 1: 241 (1912).
Epiblastus basalis Schltr., Repert. Spec. Nov. Regni Veg. Beih. 1: 236 (1911).
Epiblastus buruensis J.J.Sm., Bull. Jard. Bot. Buitenzorg, III, 9: 460 (1928).
Epiblastus chimbuensis P.Royen, Alp. Fl. New Guinea 2: 492 (1979).
Epiblastus cuneatus J.J.Sm., Bull. Dép. Agric. Indes Néerl. 19: 22 (1908).
Epiblastus kerigomnensis P.Royen, Alp. Fl. New Guinea 2: 490 (1979).
Epiblastus lancipetalus Schltr., Repert. Spec. Nov. Regni Veg. Beih. 1: 237 (1911).
Epiblastus masarangicus (Kraenzl.) Schltr., Repert. Spec. Nov. Regni Veg. 9: 287 (1911).
Epiblastus merrillii L.O.Williams, Philipp. J. Sci. 71: 113 (1940).
Epiblastus montihageni P.Royen, Alp. Fl. New Guinea 2: 496 (1979).
Epiblastus neohibernicus Schltr., Repert. Spec. Nov. Regni Veg. Beih. 1: 239 (1911).
Epiblastus ornithidioides Schltr., Fl. Schutzgeb. Südsee, Nachtr.: 137 (1905).
Epiblastus pteroglotta Gilli, Ann. Naturhist. Mus. Wien, B 84: 32 (1980 publ. 1983).
Epiblastus pulchellus Schltr., Repert. Spec. Nov. Regni Veg. Beih. 1: 240 (1911).
Epiblastus pullei J.J.Sm., Bull. Jard. Bot. Buitenzorg, II, 13: 57 (1914).
Epiblastus schultzei Schltr., Bot. Jahrb. Syst. 58: 69 (1922).
Epiblastus sciadanthus (F.Muell.) Schltr., Fl. Schutzgeb. Südsee, Nachtr.: 137 (1905).
Epiblastus torricellensis Schltr., Repert. Spec. Nov. Regni Veg. Beih. 1: 238 (1911).
Epiblastus tuberculatus R.S.Rogers, Trans. & Proc. Roy. Soc. South Australia 49: 256 (1925).

References 

  (1905) Die Flora der Deutschen Schutzgebiete in der Südsee 136.
  (2006). Epidendroideae (Part One). Genera Orchidacearum 4: 558. Oxford University Press.

External links 

 
Podochileae genera